

Incumbents
President: Eduardo Camaño (until January 2), Eduardo Duhalde (starting January 2)
Vice President: vacant

Governors
Governor of Buenos Aires Province: Carlos Ruckauf (until 3 January); Felipe Solá (starting 3 January)
Governor of Catamarca Province: Oscar Castillo 
Governor of Chaco Province: Ángel Rozas 
Governor of Chubut Province: José Luis Lizurume 
Governor of Córdoba: José Manuel De la Sota 
Governor of Corrientes Province: Ricardo Colombi 
Governor of Entre Ríos Province: Sergio Montiel 
Governor of Formosa Province: Gildo Insfrán
Governor of Jujuy Province: Eduardo Fellner 
Governor of La Pampa Province: Rubén Marín 
Governor of La Rioja Province: Ángel Maza 
Governor of Mendoza Province: Roberto Iglesias 
Governor of Misiones Province: Carlos Rovira
Governor of Neuquén Province: Jorge Sobisch 
Governor of Río Negro Province: Pablo Verani 
Governor of Salta Province: Juan Carlos Romero 
Governor of San Juan Province: Alfredo Avelín (until 22 August); Wbaldino Acosta (starting 22 August)
Governor of San Luis Province: María Alicia Lemme 
Governor of Santa Cruz Province: Néstor Kirchner 
Governor of Santa Fe Province: Carlos Reutemann 
Governor of Santiago del Estero: 
 until 25 November: Carlos Ricardo Díaz 
 25 November-12 December: Darío Moreno
 starting 12 December: Mercedes Aragonés
Governor of Tierra del Fuego: Carlos Manfredotti 
Governor of Tucumán: Julio Miranda

Vice Governors
Vice Governor of Buenos Aires Province: Felipe Solá (until 3 January); vacant thereafter (starting 3 January)
Vice Governor of Catamarca Province: Hernán Colombo 
Vice Governor of Chaco Province: Roy Nikisch 
Vice Governor of Corrientes Province: Eduardo Leonel Galantini
Vice Governor of Entre Rios Province: Edelmiro Tomás Pauletti 
Vice Governor of Formosa Province: Floro Bogado 
Vice Governor of Jujuy Province: Rubén Daza 
Vice Governor of La Pampa Province: Heriberto Mediza 
Vice Governor of La Rioja Province: Luis Beder Herrera 
Vice Governor of Misiones Province: Mercedes Margarita Oviedo
Vice Governor of Nenquen Province: Jorge Sapag 
Vice Governor of Rio Negro Province: Bautista Mendioroz 
Vice Governor of Salta Province: Walter Wayar 
Vice Governor of San Juan Province: Marcelo Lima
Vice Governor of San Luis Province: Blanca Pereyra 
Vice Governor of Santa Cruz: vacant
Vice Governor of Santa Fe Province: Marcelo Muniagurria 
Vice Governor of Santiago del Estero: vacant 
Vice Governor of Tierra del Fuego: Daniel Gallo

Events

January
 January 1: The Legislative Assembly gathers and chooses senator Eduardo Duhalde as interim president.
 January 2: President Duhalde announces the end of the 1:1 peso-dollar fixed exchange rate (convertibility) after almost 11 years.

February

March

April

May

June
 June 25: The exchange rate briefly reaches 4 pesos per U.S. dollar in the free market, which means the national currency has lost 75% of its value in 7 months.

July

August

September
September 4: Argentina defeated the United States, 87–80, at the World Basketball Championships in Indianapolis, Indiana.  It was the first loss ever in international play for a United States team containing National Basketball Association players.

October

November

December

Deaths
 October 8: César Milstein (b. 1927), scientist, co-awarded the 1984 Nobel Prize for his work on monoclonal antibodies
 December 23: Hilario Fernández Long (b. 1918), engineer and educator

Sports
See worldwide 2002 in sports

 
Years of the 21st century in Argentina
2000s in Argentina
Argentina
Argentina